The Leica X (Typ 113) is a large sensor digital compact camera announced by Leica Camera on September 16, 2014. It improves on its predecessor, the Leica X2, with a higher resolution rear display and brighter 23mm f/1.7 lens that allows a shallower depth of field.

References
http://www.dpreview.com/products/leica/compacts/leica_x113/specifications

X (Typ 113)
Cameras introduced in 2014